Windpark Ellern is a wind farm facility located in Ellern in the Rhein-Hunsrück-Kreis in Rhineland-Pfalz, Germany. Positioned along the crest of the Soonwald, the wind farm is one of the largest in southwestern Germany, and combined with a nearby wind farm in Kirchberg is among the country's major on-shore wind power areas.
According to the energy company juwi, the eight wind turbine facility is capable of generating up to 46.5MW of energy, enough to power 33,000 residences and other buildings of other purposes, and cut down 84,700 tonnes of carbon dioxide emissions, equivalent to taking off the road 18,140 fossil-fed cars.

Construction of the facility began in 2012, consisting of five 135 metre tall turbines manufactured by Enercon. Three other turbines were constructed shortly thereafter. While construction activity has provided jobs to the area, the facility has been controversial. Some local residents have formed protest organizations, arguing that the turbines have negatively affected the bucolic nature of the Soonwald and the Hunsrück.

External links

 Windpark Ellern in German

 
Economy of Rhineland-Palatinate